Achola Suzan Engola is a Ugandan politician. In 2011, she was elected as a member of parliament for Apac District. She was re-elected in the 2021 Ugandan general election, held on 14 January 2021.

She is a member of the Uganda People's Congress political party.

See also 
 List of members of the eleventh Parliament of Uganda
Uganda People's Congress
Member of Parliament
Parliament of Uganda
Apac District

References

External links 

 Website of the Parliament of Uganda

Women members of the Parliament of Uganda
21st-century Ugandan women politicians
21st-century Ugandan politicians
Living people
Year of birth missing (living people)
Members of the Parliament of Uganda
Uganda People's Congress politicians